The Counter Terrorism Department (CTD) formerly known as the Crime Investigation Department (CID), are crime scene investigation, interrogation, anti-terrorism, and intelligence bureaus of the provincial police services of Pakistan.

CID bureaus are usually commanded by an Inspector General of Police. In Karachi, CTD teams have gathered intelligence to take action against organized crime, and, alongside the FIA and the IB, have infiltrated terrorist cells to track down TTP, Islamic State, al-Qaeda and other terror and separatist groups' operatives.

Between 2010 and 2015, the Crime Investigation Departments (CIDs) in a number of provinces were renamed to "Counter Terrorism Departments" (CTDs).

Formation and organization

In 1902, the British government formed CID bureaus all over the British Raj. After the independence of Pakistan in 1947, CID bureaus were equally distributed to Pakistan. In Punjab and Sindh, CID bureaus were formed in 1947; and during the successive years, CID bureaus were established in Balochistan and Khyber-Pakhtunkhwa.

However, as a result of rising terrorism in Pakistan CIDs were restructured as CTDs as per the framework of the National Action Plan (Pakistan) under the command of the respective provincial police departments. The CTD of the respective province now accumulate information, intelligence and carry out operations against the terrorists organizations.

There are presently four CTDs each names after their relevant jurisdictional province. These are the CTD Punjab, the CTD Khyber Pakhtunkhwa, the CTD Sindh, and the CTD Balochistan. Each of the CTD is either headed by the Additional Inspector General of Police (Addtional IGP) or the Deputy Inspector General of Police (DIGP) depending on the size of the department. In the case of Punjab, Sindh and KP, it is often Addtional IGP who heads the organization. CTD is then further subdivided into various sections and units which are led by the DIG or SSP rank officers who heads the each section tasked with operations, Intelligence and Investigations.

Each provincial CTD is divided into various zones located at various Divisions of the each province. For instance, CTD Sindh is divided into 5 zones i.e Karachi, Hyderabad, Sukkur, Larkana and Nawabshah. Each of the zones is either headed by an SSP or SP rank officer. These zones comprise CTD police stations located at various districts of the each zone. The Police Station of the CTD is often headed by an Inspector or Sub-Inspector rank officer who is called as Station House Officer (SHO).

The CTD in Punjab has its own Counter Terrorism Force that aids the department to raid the terrorists. While the CTD KP relies on Elite Force of the KP Police to raid the terrorist hideouts.

The manpower for all four CTD is mostly comes from their relevant provincial police departments. The officers and constables mostly absorbed into the CTD from the provincial police departments of the relevant police force. Thus, the most of the officers or constables that serve in CTD are locals of those areas in which they operate. This helps CTD in its operations against the terrorists.

Bureaus

CTD Sindh 
In Sindh, the CTD bureau is led by an additional inspector-general of police, and has several other sub-bureaus established all over Karachi.

Other CTD sub-bureaus are located in Larkana, Sukkar, Hyderabad, and Mirpur, and are each led by a superintendent of police (SP). In Karachi, the CTD bureaus work on crime scene investigations, interrogations of suspects, antiterrorism, and intelligence in the city. In 2023, the Sindh government has increased the CTD budget by Rs2.83 billion rupees, which will be used to acquire equipment and weapons for CTD worth Rs72.28 million. Additionally, new vehicles worth Rs800 million will be purchased for the officers and staff in order to extend the CTD throughout Sindh.

In 2010, the TPP coordinated a terrorist attack at the CID building in Karachi, nearly destroying the entire headquarters. Since 2010, Karachi CTD personnel have engaged in police encounters, shoot-outs, murder cases, and high speed chases involving the al-Qaeda and TTP terrorists. In 2015, CTD teams gunned down four al-Qaeda operatives after a high speed chase took place in Qayyumabad in Karachi. Due to the highly penetrative skills of CTD Sindh, cells belonging to the various terrorists organizations, have been dismantled, the security situation of Sindh, most importantly in Karachi, have seen drastic improvement. The separatist insurgency in Sindh has also been an utter failure and was not able to ignite beyond a certain limit. Presently, the CTD Sindh is aggressively going after the remaining separatists cells active in Urban and Rural Sindh.

CTD Punjab 

The Punjab Police's CID bureau was renamed the Counter Terrorism Department in line with similar renamings across Pakistan in 2010. After a restructuring in 2015, the CTD was assigned additional terrorism-related functions beyond its traditional intelligence duties. Operational counter terrorism forces were also allocated to the CTD with the creation of the Counter Terrorism Force, made up of specially trained police officers and potentially military personnel.

CTD Khyber-Pakhtunkhwa (KPK) 
The CTD bureau in Khyber-Pakhtunkhwa often works with personnel of the Frontier Corps and Federal Investigation Agency as well as other offices of the Khyber-Pakhtunkhwa Police to execute its investigation, counterterrorism, and intelligence functions. The CTD bureau is headed by an additional inspector-general of police with headquarters in Peshawar. It is further divided into 14 Regional zones headed by the SSP or SP rank officers. The zones are located across the various divisions of KPK which include CTD Peshawar, CTD Bannu, CTD DI Khan, CTD Malakand, and CTD Kohat. It is again further sub-divided into various police stations and centres located in each district of the KPK.

The Peshawar CTD bureau has carried out raids on the hideouts of TPP militants. In 2013, the bureau was restructured and the Elite Force and Counter Terrorism Directorate (CTD), which work with the special agents of the FIA to carry out counter-terrorism operations, were added.

In the past, the CTD played a lead role in operations against criminals, smugglers and outlaws. In case of any extraordinary situation, the Frontier Constabulary would be called to assist the police in maintaining law and order. As of now, the Peshawar CTD now focuses on conducting criminal investigation and solving murder cases.

After the Fall of Kabul in August 2021, Pakistan has seen the revival of tide of terrorism. CTD KP has been at forefront to bear the burnt of changes across the border in Afghanistan. CTD KP has undertaken dozens of Intelliegence Based Operations along with the other Law Enforcement Agencies (LEAs) in which score of militants has been gunned down. The most prominent operation among them was search and strike operation in Swat district carried out by CTD KP to clear out various hilltops and ridge of mountains occupied by the militants. As of now, the CTD KP is highly active against the militants groups operating in the districts adjacent to the Afghanistan-Pakistan border.

In the wake of the Peshawar Police Lines attack, an appex committee meeting was convened in Peshawar under the chairmanship of the Prime Minister of Pakistan Shahbaz Sharif that was also attended by the Chief of Army Staff (COAS) Asim Munir in which updradation plan for the CTD KPK was approved. It was decided that the CTD KP would be armed with modern equipments, a new Headquaters along with forensic laboratory would be constructed in order to foster the investigation capabilities of the department.

CTD Balochistan 
The CID bureau in Balochistan was established by the Balochistan Police in 2000. It was restructed as CTD Balochistan. Currently, the CID bureau is headed by a deputy inspector general of police with its headquaters in Quetta. The CTD Balochistan has its own Counter Terrorism Force. It can also be assisted by the Balochistan Constabulary and the Balocistan Levies. The department has been many successes against the separatist and sectarian organizations. It has killed dozen of militants including prominent commanders of the banned entities. In one of such successful operation a terror training camp operated by the Islamic State(ISIS),was stormed by the CTD in Mastung, Balochistan in August 2021, resulting in the elimination of 11 ISIS terrorists.

CTD Azad Kashmir 
Given the rise in the threats of the terrorsm, the Government of Pakistan has decided to expand CTD to Azad Kashmir in 2023.

Vehicles 

 Toyota Hilux (single-cabin)
 Toyota Corolla
 Toyota Hilux (double cabin)
 Land Rover Defender

List of the operations carried out by the CTD 
2023

 February

2 terrorists were gunned down by the CTD KP in Nowsher district.

26 IBOs were carried out by the CTD on various parts of Punjab in which mastermind of a car bomb blast in Rawalpindi was killed by the CTD Punjab whereas 11 other terrorists were arrested.

7 terrorists killed by the CTD in North Waziristan.

A suspected terrorist of a proscribed organization supported by the Research and Analysis Wing of India involved in two dozen blasts was arrested by the CTD Sindh in Jamshoro.

2 terrorists belonging to Pakistani Taliban were arrested by the CTD Punjab in Dera Ghazi Khan.

CTD Punjab killed one TTP commander in Mianwali.

CTD Balochistan arrested a women suicide bomber in Quetta on 18 February 2023.

CTD Punjab arrested 8 TTP terrorists on 18 February 2023.

See also
 List of law enforcement agencies in Pakistan
 Rangers Anti-Terrorism Wing

References

External links
CTD Sindh
CTD Punjab
CTD KPK

Law enforcement agencies of Pakistan
Criminal investigation
Pakistani intelligence agencies
Provincial law enforcement agencies of Pakistan